Mario Frick may refer to:
Mario Frick (politician) (born 1965), politician from Liechtenstein
Mario Frick (footballer) (born 1974), footballer from Liechtenstein